Stefan Weinrich (born 18 September 1945) is a German former swimmer. He competed in the men's 400 metre individual medley at the 1964 Summer Olympics, finishing fourth in his heat and not proceeding to the finals.

References

External links
 

1945 births
Living people
German male swimmers
Olympic swimmers of the United Team of Germany
Swimmers at the 1964 Summer Olympics
People from Glauchau
Sportspeople from Saxony